In plants, nutrient resorption is a process in which nutrients are withdrawn from senescing plant tissues. It acts as a nutrient conservation mechanism.  It is influenced by several environmental and physiological processes.

References

External links 
 Nutrient resorption or accumulation of desert plants with contrasting sodium regulation strategies

Plant nutrition